{{Infobox settlement
| name                     = Dumfries and GallowayDumfries an GallowaDùn Phris is Gall-Ghaidhealaibh
| native_name_lang         = 
| other_name               = 
| image_skyline            = 
| image_flag               = Dumfries and galloway flag.svg
| image_shield             = Arms of the Dumfries and Galloway Regional Council.svg
| image_blank_emblem       = 
| blank_emblem_type        = 
| blank_emblem_size        = 
| seat_type                = Admin HQ
| seat                     = County Buildings, English Street, Dumfries
| leader_title1            = Leader
| leader_name1             = Gail MacGregor (Cons)
| subdivision_type         = Sovereign state
| subdivision_name         = United Kingdom
| subdivision_type1        = 
| subdivision_type2        = Council area
| subdivision_type3        = Lieutenancy areas
| subdivision_name1        = Scotland
| subdivision_name3        = DumfriesStewartry of KirkcudbrightWigtown
| area_footnotes           = 
| area_total_km2           = 
| area_rank                = Ranked 
| population_footnotes     = 
| population_total         = 
| population_as_of         = 
| population_rank          = Ranked 
| population_density_km2   = auto
| area_code_type           = ONS code
| area_code                = S12000006
| iso_code                 = GB-DGY
| website                  = 
}}

Dumfries and Galloway is one of 32 unitary council areas of Scotland and is located in the western Southern Uplands. It covers the historic counties of Dumfriesshire, Kirkcudbrightshire, and Wigtownshire, the latter two of which are collectively known as Galloway. The administrative centre and largest settlement is the town of Dumfries.

Following the 1975 reorganisation of local government in Scotland, the three counties were joined to form a single region of Dumfries and Galloway, with four districts within it. The districts were abolished in 1996, since when Dumfries and Galloway has been a unitary local authority. For lieutenancy purposes, the area is divided into three lieutenancy areas called Dumfries, Wigtown and the Stewartry of Kirkcudbright, broadly corresponding to the three historic counties.

To the north, Dumfries and Galloway borders East Ayrshire, South Ayrshire, and South Lanarkshire; in the east the Borders; and to the south the county of Cumbria in England and the Solway Firth.

 Geography 
The Dumfries and Galloway Council region is composed of counties and their sub-areas. From east to west:
 Dumfriesshire County
 the sub-area of Dumfriesshire – Annandale
 the sub-area of Dumfriesshire – Eskdale
 the sub-area of Dumfriesshire – Nithsdale
 Kirkcudbrightshire County
 the sub-area of Kirkcudbrightshire – Stewartry (archaically, Desnes)
 Wigtownshire County
 the sub-area of Wigtownshire – Machars (archaically, Farines)--divided into census areas (civil parish areas)
 the sub-area of Wigtownshire – Rhins of Galloway divided into census areas (civil parish areas)

The term Dumfries and Galloway has been used since at least the 19th century – by 1911 the three counties had a united sheriffdom under that name. Dumfries and Galloway covers the majority of the western area of the Southern Uplands, it also hosts Scotland's most Southerly point, at the Mull of Galloway in the west of the region.

 Water systems and transport routes
The region has a number of south running water systems which break through the Southern Uplands creating the main road, and rail, arteries north–south through the region and breaking the hills up into a number of ranges.

 River Cree valley carries the A714 north-westward from Newton Stewart to Girvan and Water of Minnoch valley which lies just west of the Galloway Hills carries a minor road northward through Glentrool village into South Ayrshire. This road leaves the A714 at Bargrennan.
 Water of Ken and River Dee form a corridor through the hills called the Glenkens which carries the A713 road from Castle Douglas to Ayr. The Galloway Hills lie to the west of this route through the hills and the Carsphairn and Scaur Hills lie to the east.
 River Nith rises between Dalmellington and New Cumnock in Ayrshire and runs east then south down Nithsdale to Dumfries. Nithsdale carries both the A76 road and the rail line from Dumfries to Kilmarnock. It separates the Carsphairn and Scaur Hills from the Lowther Hills which lie east of the Nith.
 River Annan combines with Evan Water and the River Clyde to form one of the principal routes into central Scotland from England – through Annandale and Clydesdale – carrying the M74 and the west coast railway line. This gap through the hills separates the Lowthers from the Moffat Hills.
 River Esk enters the Solway Firth just south of Gretna having travelled south from Langholm and Eskdalemuir. The A7 travels up Eskdale as far as Langholm and from Langholm carries on up the valley of Ewes Water to Teviothead where it starts to follow the River Teviot to Hawick. Eskdale itself heads north west from Langholm through Bentpath and Eskdalemuir to Ettrick and Selkirk.

The A701 branches off the M74 at Beattock, goes through the town of Moffat, climbs to Annanhead above the Devil's Beef Tub (at the source of the River Annan) before passing the source of the River Tweed and carrying on to Edinburgh. Until fairly recent times the ancient route to Edinburgh travelled right up Annandale to the Beef Tub before climbing steeply to Annanhead. The present road ascends northward on a ridge parallel to Annandale but to the west of it which makes for a much easier ascent.

From Moffat the A708 heads north east along the valley of Moffat Water (Moffatdale) on its way to Selkirk. Moffatdale separates the Moffat hills (to the north) from the Ettrick hills to the south.

 National scenic areas 
There are three National scenic areas within this region.

 Nith Estuary: this area follows the River Nith southward from just south of Dumfries into the Solway Firth. Dumfries itself has a rich history going back over 800 years as a Royal Burgh (1186). It is particularly remembered as the place where Robert the Bruce murdered the Red Comyn in 1306 before being crowned King of Scotland – and where Robert Burns spent his last years. His mausoleum is in St Michael's graveyard. Going down the east bank is the village of Glencaple, Caerlaverock Castle, Caerlaverock Wild Fowl Trust, an ancient Roman fort on Ward Law Hill and nearby in Ruthwell is the Ruthwell Cross and the Brow Well where Robert Burns "took the waters" and bathed in the Solway just before his death. On the west bank, there are several walks and cycle routes in Mabie Forest, Kirkconnell Flow for the naturalist, the National Museum of Costume just outside New Abbey and Sweetheart Abbey within the village. Criffel (569 metres) offers the hill walker a reasonably modest walk with views across the Solway to the Lake District. The house of John Paul Jones founder of the American Navy is also open to visitors near Kirkbean.
 East Stewartry Coast: this takes in the coast line from Balcary Point eastward across Auchencairn Bay and the Rough Firth past Sandyhills to Mersehead. There are several coastal villages within this area – Auchencairn, Kippford, Colvend, Rockcliffe, and Portling. There is also a round tower at Orchardton and the islands of Hestan Isle and Rough Island can be reached at low tide outside the breeding season for birds. Mersehead is a wildfowl reserve. The area has a number of coastal paths.
 Fleet Valley: this area takes in Fleet Bay with its holiday destinations of Auchenlarie, Mossyard Bay, Cardoness, Sandgreen and Carrick Shore. The area also includes the town of Gatehouse of Fleet and the historic villages of Anworth and Girthon – there is a castle at Cardoness in the care of Historic Scotland.

 Transport 
Transport in the region is operated by bus companies Houston's, McEwan's, Stagecoach Western and McCall's coaches, and train operators ScotRail, TransPennine Express and Avanti West Coast.

 Railway 

The region has seven working railway stations. All are on the Glasgow South Western Line, except Lockerbie which is on the West Coast Main Line.
 Stranraer railway station
 Kirkconnel railway station
 Sanquhar railway station
 Dumfries railway station
 Annan railway station
 Gretna Green railway station
 Lockerbie railway station

 The Port line 
The mainline from Dumfries railway station via Newton Stewart to Stranraer Harbour railway station, was closed under the Beeching cuts. The line previously connected London Euston and the West Coast Main Line with the ferries to Larne Harbour railway station and the Port of Belfast.

The Port Road line to Stranraer was the last to go in June 1965, leaving only the original G&SWR main line open to serve the Stranraer.  The Beeching cuts ended the Castle Douglas and Dumfries Railway and Portpatrick and Wigtownshire Railway has resulted in adverse mileage to connect Stranraer with a longer line via Kilmarnock and Ayr.

 Bus and coach 
The area is served by buses which connect the main population centres. Express bus services link the main towns with Glasgow, Ayr, Edinburgh and Carlisle. Local bus services also operate across the region.

 Sea 

Dumfries and Galloway is home to two ports which have services to Northern Ireland, both are in the West of the region. Stena Line and P&O Irish Sea both have a port in the village of Cairnryan.

 Air 

The region also has no commercial airports; the nearest are Glasgow Prestwick Airport and Carlisle Lake District Airport. The region does host a number of private airfields.
The town of Lockerbie was the scene of the Pan Am Flight 103 terrorist attack on 21 December 1988.

 Roads 
The main roads to and from the region are:
 M6
 A74(M)
 A75
 A76
 A77
 A701
 A709

 Emergency services 
Police Scotland is the police force for the region. Its predecessor, Dumfries and Galloway Constabulary (dissolved 2014) was the smallest police force in the United Kingdom. The Scottish Fire and Rescue Service (formerly Dumfries and Galloway Fire and Rescue Service) provides firefighting services across the region. The Coastguard, Lifeboats, Moffat mountain rescue and Galloway Mountain Rescue also offer emergency services across Dumfries and Galloway.

Nith Inshore Rescue is based at Glencaple. This independent lifeboat provides water rescue cover for the River Nith, surrounding rivers and inland water.  Nith Inshore Rescue is a declared facility for HM Coastguard, the control centre and overseeing authority responsible for call outs.

NHS Dumfries and Galloway provides healthcare services across the region. The two main hospitals are the Dumfries and Galloway Royal Infirmary in Dumfries and Galloway Community Hospital in Stranraer.

 Education 
Dumfries & Galloway Council provides nursery, primary and secondary education across the region.

 Alternative Schools 
 Kilquhanity School

 Nursery and primary schools 

 Secondary schools 

 Annan Academy
 Castle Douglas High School
 Dalbeattie High School
 Douglas Ewart High School, Newton Stewart
 Dalry Secondary School
 Dumfries Academy
 Dumfries High School
 Kirkcudbright Academy
 Langholm Academy
 Lockerbie Academy
 Maxwelltown High School, Dumfries
 Moffat Academy
 Sanquhar Academy
 St Joseph's College
 Stranraer Academy
 Wallace Hall Academy, Thornhill

 Wildlife 
The region is known as a stronghold for several rare and protected species of amphibian, such as the Natterjack toad and the Great crested newt. There are also RSPB Nature Reserves at the Mull of Galloway, Wood of Cree (Galloway Forest Park), Ken Dee Marshes (near Loch Ken) and Mereshead (near Dalbeattie on the Solway Firth)

 Outdoor activities 
There are five 7Stanes mountain biking centres in Dumfries and Galloway at Dalbeattie, Mabie, Ae, Glentrool and Kirroughtree. The Sustrans Route 7 long distance cycle route also runs through the region. There is excellent hill walking in the Moffat Hills, Lowther Hills
 the Carsphairn and Scaur Hills
 and Galloway Hills. The Southern Upland Way coast to coast walk passes through Dumfries and Galloway and the 53-mile long Annandale Way
 travels from the Solway Firth into the Moffat hills near the Devil's Beef Tub. There is also fresh water sailing on Castle Loch at Lochmaben and at various places on Loch Ken Loch Ken also offers waterskiing and wakeboarding.
 The Solway Firth coastline offers fishing, caravaning and camping, walking and sailing.

 Arts and culture 

Dumfries and Galloway is well known for its arts and cultural activities as well as its natural environment.

The major festivals include the region-wide Dumfries & Galloway Arts Festival, and Spring Fling Open Studios. Other festivals include Big Burns Supper in Dumfries and the Wigtown Book Festival in Wigtown – Scotland's national book town.

 Towns and villages Main settlements in bold text.''

 Ae, Airieland, Airds of Kells, Annan, Anwoth, Ardwell
 Beattock, Beeswing, Borgue, Brydekirk
 Caerlaverock, Cairngaan, Cairnryan, Cargenbridge, Carsphairn, Castle Douglas, Castle Kennedy, Clarencefield, Corsock, Creetown
 Dalbeattie, Dalton, Dornock, Drumlanrig, Drummore, Dumfries, Dundrennan, Dunscore
 Eastriggs, Ecclefechan, Eskdalemuir
 Garlieston, Gatehouse of Fleet, Glenluce, Gretna Green, Gretna
 Haugh of Urr, Hoddom
 Isle of Whithorn
 Johnsfield, Johnstonebridge
 Keir, Kelloholm, Kippford, Kirkbean, Kirkcolm, Kirkcowan Kirkcudbright, Kirkconnel, Kirkinner, Kirkpatrick Durham 
 Langholm, Leswalt, Locharbriggs, Lochmaben, Lockerbie
 Middleshaw, Millhousebridge, Mochrum, Moffat, Moniaive, Muirhead, Mull of Galloway
 New Abbey, New Galloway, New Luce, Newton Stewart, Newton Wamphray
 Palnackie, Parkgate, Parton, Penpont, Portpatrick, Port William
 Ringford, Robgill Tower, Ruthwell
 Sandhead, Sanquhar, Sorbie, St John's Town of Dalry, Stoneykirk, Stranraer
 Templand, Terregles, Thornhill, Twynholm
 Unthank
 Wanlockhead, Whithorn, Wigtown

Places of interest 

 Annandale distillery - Scotch Whisky
 Bladnoch Distillery & Visitor Centre - Scotch Whisky
 Caerlaverock Castle – Historic Scotland
 Caerlaverock NNR (national nature reserve)
 WWT Caerlaverock – a reserve of the Wildfowl and Wetlands Trust
 Cardoness Castle
 Castle of St John, Stranraer
 Corsewall Lighthouse, privately owned
 Drumlanrig Castle
 HM Factory, Gretna, Eastriggs – site of a munitions factory during World War I
 Galloway Forest Park, Forestry and Land Scotland
 Galloway Hydro Electric Scheme, Scottish Power
 Glenlair – home of 19th century physicist James Clerk Maxwell
 Glenluce Abbey
 Isle of Whithorn Castle
 Kenmure Castle – a seat of the Clan Gordon
 Loch Ken
 MacLellan's Castle, Kirkcudbright
 Motte of Urr
 Mull of Galloway – RSPB/ South Rhins Community Development Trust
 Ruthwell Cross
 Samye Ling Tibetan Monastery
 Southern Upland Way – long distance footpath
 Sweetheart Abbey, New Abbey
 Threave Castle

Governance

Administrative history
Prior to 1975, the area that is now Dumfries and Galloway was administered as three separate counties: Dumfriesshire, Kirkcudbrightshire, and Wigtownshire. The counties of Scotland originated as sheriffdoms, which were established from the twelfth century, consisting of a group of parishes over which a sheriff had jurisdiction. An elected county council was established for each county in 1890 under the Local Government (Scotland) Act 1889.

The three county councils were abolished in 1975 under the Local Government (Scotland) Act 1973, which established a two-tier structure of local government across Scotland comprising upper-tier regions and lower-tier districts. A region called Dumfries and Galloway was created covering the area of the three counties, which were abolished as administrative areas. The region contained four districts:
Annandale and Eskdale, covering the eastern part of Dumfriesshire.
Nithsdale, covering the western part of Dumfriesshire and a small part of Kirkcudbrightshire.
Stewartry, covering most of Kirkcudbrightshire.
Wigtown, covering all of Wigtownshire and a small part of Kirkcudbrightshire.

Further local government reform in 1996 under the Local Government etc. (Scotland) Act 1994 saw the area's four districts abolished, with the Dumfries and Galloway Council taking over the functions they had previously performed. The council continues to use the areas of the four abolished districts as committee areas. The four former districts are also used to define the area's three lieutenancy areas, with Nithsdale and Annandale and Eskdale together forming the Dumfries lieutenancy, the Stewartry district corresponding to the Stewartry of Kirkcudbright lieutenancy, and the Wigtown district corresponding to the Wigtown lieutenancy.

The council headquarters is at the Council Offices at 113 English Street in Dumfries, which had been built in 1914 as the headquarters for the old Dumfriesshire County Council, previously being called "County Buildings".

Political control
The first election to the Dumfries and Galloway Regional Council was held in 1974, initially operating as a shadow authority alongside the outgoing authorities until the new system came into force on 16 May 1975. A shadow authority was again elected in 1995 ahead of the reforms which came into force on 1 April 1996. Political control of the council since 1975 has been as follows:

Regional council

Unitary authority

Leadership
Since 2007 the council has been required to designate a leader of the council. The leader may also act as the convener, chairing council meetings, or the council may choose to appoint a different councillor to be convener. Prior to 2007 the council sometimes chose to appoint a leader, and sometimes did not. The leaders since 2007 have been:

Elections

Since 2007 elections have been held every five years under the single transferable vote system of election. This system was introduced by the Local Governance (Scotland) Act 2004 to achieve a reasonably proportionately representative outcome. Election results since 1995 have been as follows:

Gallery

See also 
 Anglo-Scottish border
 Fire and Rescue Authority (Scotland)
 List of places in Dumfries and Galloway

References

External links 
 
 
 

 
Regions of Scotland
Council areas of Scotland
1975 establishments in Scotland